The Lilly Prize may refer to:

 Ruth Lilly Poetry Prize
 Eli Lilly Award in Biological Chemistry
 Lilly Medal for animal conservation